Two-stage presidential elections were held in Finland in 1931. On 15 and 16 January the public elected presidential electors to an electoral college. They in turn elected the President.The result was a victory for Pehr Evind Svinhufvud, who won on the third ballot by just two votes. The turnout for the popular vote was 47.3%.

Background
This presidential election was held during an ideologically, politically, socially and economically tense time.  The Great Depression was impoverishing many Finnish farmers and workers.  The far-right Lapua Movement had not settled for the ban of the Communist Party and its affiliated organizations in the autumn of 1930.  It wanted to help elect a President who would also strongly oppose the Social Democrats and moderate bourgeois parties, such as the Progressives.  Although Svinhufvud disapproved of the Lapua Movement's violent kidnappings of left-wing politicians and other illegal acts, he was their preferred presidential candidate.  Former President K.J. Ståhlberg, a champion of democracy, parliamentarism and the rule of law, had been briefly kidnapped by some activists of the Lapua Movement with his wife in October 1930.  He was chosen as the Progressive presidential candidate.  Speaker of the Finnish Parliament, Kyösti Kallio, held ideals similar to those of Ståhlberg, and he became the Agrarian presidential candidate.  The outgoing President, Lauri Kristian Relander, had lost the Agrarian presidential candidacy to Kallio, because he did not condemn the Lapua Movement as strongly as Kallio did, and a sufficient number of Agrarians believed that Kallio could control the Lapua Movement's extremists more effectively than Relander.  Right-wing Finns and some centrists, such as a prominent Agrarian parliamentarian, Juho Niukkanen, were concerned that Ståhlberg's re-election (after a six-year break) as the Finnish President would escalate political tensions in Finland.  The Commander-in-Chief of the Civil Guards (a bourgeois voluntary defence organization), Major General Lauri Malmberg, announced in the Finnish Parliament that he would not guarantee order among the Civil Guards, if Ståhlberg was elected president.  Svinhufvud's razor-thin victory required Niukkanen's arm-twisting tactics, whereby he pressured all the Agrarian presidential electors to support Svinhufvud.  This 69-year-old and slightly ailing conservative politician was considered by his supporters as a sufficiently bold, solid and patriotic man to re-unite the ideologically divided Finns.  His pro-democracy supporters hoped that he could keep both right-wing extremists and left-wing extremists in check.

Results

Popular vote

Electoral college

References

1931
1931 elections in Finland
January 1931 events